Sandan SD may refer to:
 Dan (rank)
 Desmodium oojeinense
 Hittite god Sandas